General elections were held in Saint Vincent and the Grenadines on 25 July 1984. The result was a victory for the New Democratic Party, which won nine of the thirteen seats. Voter turnout was 88.8%.

Results

References

Saint Vincent
Elections in Saint Vincent and the Grenadines
1984 in Saint Vincent and the Grenadines